Madison Lake may refer to:

 Madison Lake, Ohio, a community
 Madison Lake (Ohio), the body of water the community is named after
 Madison Lake Dam, the dam that created the lake
 Madison Lake State Park, the state park that formed around the lake
 Madison Lake, Minnesota, a community
 Madison Lake (Minnesota), the body of water the community is named after